Almites is a genus belonging to the Marathonitidae families. They are an extinct group of ammonoids, which are shelled cephalopods related to squids, belemnites, octopuses, and cuttlefish, and more distantly to the nautiloids.

References

 The Paleobiology Database accessed on 10/01/07

Goniatitida genera
Marathonitaceae